"Pickup Man" is a song written by Kerry Kurt Phillips and Howard Perdew, and recorded by American country music artist Joe Diffie.  It was released in October 1994 as the second single from the album Third Rock from the Sun.  The song was his longest-lasting Number One hit, having spent four weeks at Number One on the Billboard Hot Country Singles & Tracks (now Hot Country Songs) charts between December 1994 and January 1995.

Content
The song, a moderate up-tempo, is about a man who reasons he can meet the woman of his dreams by driving a pickup truck. At one point, he is able to secure a ride for a high school homecoming queen. 
"Pickup man", in this sense, has a double meaning — i.e., he is not only driving a pickup truck, but he is also "picking up" women in it.

Music video
The music video was directed by Deaton-Flanigen Productions. The majority of the music video for this song was filmed on location at a drive-in theater in Lewisburg, Tennessee.

The dead man from the Prop Me Up Beside The Jukebox (If I Die) music video makes a cameo, lounging in the bed of a pickup truck.

In popular culture
In 2005, a rewritten version of "Pickup Man" was used in television commercials for the restaurant chain Applebee's, to promote their "Carside To Go" service.

Country singer Jason Aldean's Top 20 single "1994", a tribute to Diffie which appeared on Aldean's 2012 album Night Train, references "Pickup Man" in the chorus.

Personnel
Compiled from the liner notes.
Joe Diffie – lead and background vocals
Stuart Duncan – fiddle
Paul Franklin – steel guitar
Brent Mason – electric guitar
Larry Paxton – bass guitar
Matt Rollings – piano
Billy Joe Walker Jr. – acoustic guitar
Lonnie Wilson – drums

Chart positions
"Pickup Man" debuted at number 56 on the U.S. Billboard Hot Country Singles & Tracks for the week of October 22, 1994.

Year-end charts

References

1994 singles
1994 songs
Joe Diffie songs
Music videos directed by Deaton-Flanigen Productions
Song recordings produced by Bob Montgomery (songwriter)
Epic Records singles
Songs written by Kerry Kurt Phillips
Songs about cars